The Landtag of Baden-Württemberg is the diet of the German state of Baden-Württemberg. It convenes in Stuttgart and currently consists of 154 members of five political parties. The majority before the 2021 election was a coalition of the Alliance 90/The Greens and the Christian Democratic Union (CDU), supporting the cabinet of Green Minister-President Winfried Kretschmann.

Current Composition

After the elections of 14 March 2021, the composition of the Landtag is as follows:

Elections are conducted using a mixed-member proportional representation system, with a minimum of 5% vote share to receive any seats. However, there are some exceptions, making the Baden-Württemberg election system one of the most complicated in Germany.

The minimum size of the Landtag is 120 members, of which 70 members are elected in single-member constituencies with first-past-the-post voting, and 50 are elected by proportional representation. Overhang and levelling seats may be added.

The main difference in their electoral system compared to the federal Bundestag is that there are no list members, making all members local.

This does mean that a candidate who placed second within their district isn't guaranteed a seat, if other losers in their party were more popular and if their party only needs a small number of seats to maintain proportionality.

Historical Composition

Presidents of the Landtag
So far, the presidents of the Landtag of Baden-Württemberg have been:
 1952–1960 Carl Neinhaus, Christian Democratic Union (CDU)
 1960–1968 Franz Gurk, CDU
 1968–1976 Camill Wurz, CDU
 1976–1980 Erich Ganzenmüller, CDU
 1980–1982 Lothar Gaa, CDU
 1982–1992 Erich Schneider, CDU
 1992–1996 Fritz Hopmeier, CDU
 1996–2011 Peter Straub, CDU
 2011 Willi Stächele, CDU
 2011–2015 Guido Wolf, CDU
 2015-2016 Wilfried Klenk, CDU
 2016–present Muhterem Aras, Alliance 90/The Greens

See also
 2011 Baden-Württemberg state election
 2016 Baden-Württemberg state election
 Baden Landtag elections in the Weimar Republic (1919–1929)
 Württemberg Landtag elections in the Weimar Republic (1919-1932)

References

External links
 English Version of the official Webpage

Baden-Wurttemberg
Government of Baden-Württemberg
Politics of Baden-Württemberg